The 1921 Colorado Silver and Gold football team was an American football team that represented the University of Colorado as a member of the Rocky Mountain Conference (RMC) during the 1921 college football season. In its second season under head coach Myron E. Witham, the team compiled a 4–1–1 record (4–0–1 against RMC opponents), finished second in the conference, and outscored opponents by a total of 65 to 63.

Schedule

References

Colorado
Colorado Buffaloes football seasons
Colorado Silver and Gold football